Santosh Medical College is a private medical college in Ghaziabad, Uttar Pradesh.
It was established in 1996. It was affiliated with Ch. Charan Singh University, Meerut till the establishment of Santosh University in 2007.

Admission and enrolment to various courses is strictly based on National Eligibility cum Entrance Test-Under Graduate (NEET) (UG and PG) marks and allotment is via NEET counselling

References

External links
 Official website

Private medical colleges in India
Medical colleges in Uttar Pradesh
Educational institutions established in 1996
1996 establishments in Uttar Pradesh